The Powerpuff Girls: Relish Rampage is an action-adventure video game developed by VIS Entertainment and published by Bam! Entertainment, based upon the animated series The Powerpuff Girls on Cartoon Network. It was released on the PlayStation 2 and was later released for the GameCube with added gameplay.

Gameplay
In the game, the player controls the Powerpuff Girls such as Blossom, Bubbles, and Buttercup, and must fly around a 3D world solving puzzles in an attempt to stop the invasion of Townsville by Pickles from outer space.

Plot
Mojo Jojo wanted everybody in Townsville to vote for him. Mojo Jojo invented the Radio Jojo so everybody will vote for him. The Gangreen Gang helps Mojo spread the waves so people can vote for Mojo and act like primates. The Mayor informed the girls that Mojo took delivery vans which contained the Mayor's votes and pickles. The Powerpuff Girls ended up delivering the backup ballots and pickles to the voting ballots. Across multiple levels, they defeat the Gangreen Gang and Princess Morbucks, and help the Professor turn the townspeople back to normal.

After finding and defeating Mojo Jojo, Blossom tells Mojo that he just can't beat a free pickle which is the reason why he lost the election. Mojo Jojo thus attempts to get free pickles with his radio, attracting the attention of the alien Pickloids, who invade Townsville. Mitch Mitchelson becomes their leader after eating one. The Powerpuff Girls protect the other students, save Mitch and fight off the Pickloid invasion, as well as Mojo Jojo and Sedusa, who try to take advantage of the invasion for their own ends. After convincing Mojo Jojo that he will fall victim to the Pickloid invasion if he doesn't do something, he helps the Powerpuff Girls make a ray gun that destroys most Pickloids. The remaining Pickloids kidnap the Mayor, the Professor and other townsfolk, so the Powerpuff Girls take the fight to their mothership and free everyone. The Pickloids give up their invasion and try to invade another planet, but are casually devoured by an alien frog.

Reception 
IGN gave the game a 3.8 out of 10, calling it "a bad use of a good license" and criticizing the controls as "exceedingly flawed", the missions as "extremely repetitive", the boss fights as "boring", and the game's length as "exceedingly short". They praised the girls' designs and animations and how the city looks "pretty lively" but criticized the limited animation of the boss characters.

French magazine Consoles Plus gave it a 50%, calling the production value and gameplay "disastrous" and stating that the camera movements "quickly make you want to vomit."

References

External links
The Powerpuff Girls: Relish Rampage at IGN
The Powerpuff Girls: Relish Rampage at GameSpot

2002 video games
Cartoon Network video games
GameCube games
PlayStation 2 games
The Powerpuff Girls video games
Video games developed in the United Kingdom
Alien invasions in video games
Single-player video games
Video games with cel-shaded animation
VIS Entertainment games